Zhang Qiang (born 1967), also known as Sara Chang, is a Chinese singer who started her career in the mid 1980s. She is known as the Chinese Disco Queen because of her covers of western disco songs in her early period. She is also noted for being maybe the first Mainland Chinese pop singer in a time when foreign musical influences were limited, and when the artists from Taiwan and Hong Kong were the most popular in China.

Biography

First years
Zhang was born in 1967, at the beginning of the Cultural Revolution. Her mother was a violin player for the Chinese Philharmonic Orchestra. She started learning to play the violin and piano from the age of 5. Despite her classic musical influences, she was mainly fascinated by pop and disco music, two music styles that at first, where banned in the PRC, although in the 1980s, thanks to the reform and opening, those styles started entering in China. In these years, Taiwanese and Hong Kong singers such as Teresa Teng were prominent, and fascinated the young people.

When Zhang was a student, she usually sang with a portable recorder when she returned from the school, then, she managed to find a South Korean radio station which played also western music. That is how she discovered artists such as The Beatles and Michael Jackson of whom she did not know before, and that would turn into her main influence.

When she was 18, she left the school and started singing professionally. Although her mother did not like her career choice. She left Beijing and moved temporarily to Guangzhou, where she found a job as a singer in a café. At first, she wanted to stay there, but finally a little record label from Kunming was the first interested in her voice. Yunnan Audiovisual Press, gave a positive response to Zhang's voice recordings and in 1985, she managed to release her debut album. The chief of that little company, said that Zhang had a very strong voice, and that she had an enormous potential. From then on, she would release 20 studio albums in the next two years.

Career 

Tokyo Nights, Zhang's first cover album, was released in early 1985. It is calculated that this album sold over a million copies in China. Zhang was initially expected to earn 800 yuan a month. Anyway, due to the high sales of this album, her salary was increased to 1,400 yuan, much more than the salary of her own mother who only got a salary of 70 yuan in her job as a state musician.

Zhang covered many famous songs, she covered a wide range of styles including, Pop, Disco, Techno-Pop, Rock and Chinese traditional music. Anyway, she felt more comfortable performing pop and disco tracks. She preferred cheerful "happy" songs and urban love songs. That preference could also be seen in the image of the singer, her visual looks were very modern compared to the image sponsored by the communism. Her hair and her colorful clothes were qualified as vulgar by the most conservatives, but considered as fresh by the youth.
She followed the trends of the '80s both musically and visually, which helped to make her popular.

In the next two-year, Zhang sold more than 20 million copies with her uncountable cover albums. Although, her popularity was widespread, she managed to be famous without the help of marketing. Her face could be seen nowhere in the media, only the covers of her albums featured photos of her, and the only information her fans could find, were nothing else than her releases. It is rumored that despite this enormous disadvantage, Zhang outsold Teresa Teng in 1986.

From 1988 to 1992, when she gave birth to her first child, when she was 19, she started releasing only one album per year.

Momentary retirement

In 1987, the Mainland Chinese music industry was still underdeveloped. The release of cover albums was the only way available for the Mainland Chinese new singers to perform music. In this year, Zhang started feeling that she could not cover more songs because she already had covered too many. Despite the high amount of money she earned thanks to her albums, Zhang felt tired, and wanting to do something new. She started thinking about composing original songs, but the publishers were not interested in that. Apart from that, in 1987, she went to Australia to study and from 1988 to 1992, she only recorded one album per year. After that, she decided to retire.

During that retirement, Zhang, took care of her family and in 1992, she got married in Hong Kong. She stayed in silence from then, to 1996.

Return

In 1996 after divorcing, Zhang returned to music. In the middle 1990s, the Mainland Chinese entertainment industry was starting to take off. Singers such as Na Ying, Sun Nan, Sun Yue and Yang Yuying were starting to make a name in the entertainment world and some famous singers such as Faye Wong, had returned to the mainland, working with local producers such as Zhang Yadong. Zhang reappeared with a more mature voice, with a new style and a darker image. Her 1996 album entitled "Let's Rock" was characterised by a Pop-Rock style and a harder sound compared to her previous works. It was also an important release for her because for first time in her career, all the songs were original. From then on, she started composing her own tracks.
 
In 1997, the singer released "Lonely habits" another studio album with all the songs written by herself. This album discovered a new creative face of Zhang because for first time, it included sad songs. The most of the traks were down tempo songs very different from what she did before, showing her vocal and creative maturity as a singer. She also included a promotional video for the title track of the album.

After a short period of silence in 2001, Zhang released her 30th album. She was finally recognised as an important part of the Mainland Chinese Mandopop movement. In fact, she was invited, for first time, to perform in the CCTV studios. It was the first time Zhang gave a live performance for TV.

Creatively, Zhang started experimenting with new styles such as electronic music. She got back to her usual cheerful style and songs that would characterise her following releases.

Studio albums 

Tokyo Nights (1985)
Shy Girl (1985)
Marvellous Youth (1985)
Love River (1985)
It Raining in Tokyo (1985)
Stay with me every Saturday (1985)
Tonight (1986)
I hope that tomorrow... (1986)
Next day (1986)
Beautiful day (1986)
Once again, spring comes (1986)
Naughty girl (1986)
You fly (1986)
Midnight street (1986)
Golden dream (1986)
I rejoyce (1986)
Great medley (1986)
Chic to go (1987)
I love you forever (1987)
Famous songs vol I (1987)
Famous songs vol II (1987)
From Australia (1998)
Golden Queen (1989)
More songs (1990)
Love is my treasure (1991)
Curved moon (1992)
Let's Rock (1996)
Lonely habits (1997)
Enjoy the flight (2001)
A winter coffee (2002)
I wait for your love (2005)
Don't ask me which record play (2013)

References

1967 births
Living people
Chinese women singer-songwriters
Chinese Mandopop singers
Musicians from Beijing
Singers from Beijing
EMI Records artists
20th-century Chinese women singers
21st-century Chinese women singers